Nicholas Alexander Castellanos (born March 4, 1992) is an American professional baseball right fielder for the Philadelphia Phillies of Major League Baseball (MLB). He previously played for the Detroit Tigers, Chicago Cubs and Cincinnati Reds. 

Drafted out of high school in 2010 by the Detroit Tigers, Castellanos became one of the top prospects in baseball. Castellanos appeared in the 2012 All-Star Futures Game and was named its most valuable player. He made his MLB debut with the Tigers on September 1, 2013. In 2019, the Tigers traded Castellanos to the Chicago Cubs. Before the 2020 season, he signed a four-year contract with the Cincinnati Reds. In 2021, he was selected to play in the All-Star Game, won the Silver Slugger Award, and was named to the All-MLB Second Team. Following the end of the 2021 season, he opted out of his contract with the Reds and then signed a five-year contract with the Phillies.

Early life
Castellanos was raised by his parents, Michelle and Jorge, in South Florida. His mother's family is based in Michigan. Castellanos attended the American Heritage School in Plantation, Florida, where he played for the school's baseball team. American Heritage won the Florida state championship in his sophomore year. Castellanos transferred to Archbishop McCarthy High School in Fort Lauderdale, Florida, before his junior year. He was named Gatorade Player of the Year for the state of Florida after finishing his senior season with a .542 batting average, 34 runs scored, 41 runs batted in (RBIs) and 22 stolen bases while leading his team to the Class 4A state championship. In the 2009 Under Armour All-America Baseball Game, played at Wrigley Field, he scored three runs, had four doubles and three RBIs, winning Most Valuable Player honors. The Sun-Sentinel named Castellanos the Class 6A-5A-4A Player of the Year.

Castellanos played for the United States national baseball team for individuals 18 years of age and under in the 2009 Pan American Junior Championships, in which he batted .356 with six doubles and nine RBIs, leading all players with 14 runs scored, as the team won the gold medal. Castellanos was named to the All-Tournament team. He committed to attend the University of Miami on a baseball scholarship. He intended to play college baseball for the Miami Hurricanes baseball team in the Atlantic Coast Conference.

Professional career

Minor leagues
The Detroit Tigers selected Castellanos in the second round, with the 44th overall pick, in the 2010 Major League Baseball draft. He was rated by Baseball America as the third best power hitting prospect and fourteenth best overall prospect prior to the draft. He slipped because of his commitment to the University of Miami. He signed with the Tigers, receiving a $3.45 million signing bonus, the highest bonus at that point ever given to a player taken after the first round.  The deal was almost invalidated, as the Tigers' email to the office of the Commissioner of Baseball was not received until three minutes after the midnight deadline on August 15, 2010; a text message about the deal to the Commissioner's Office received at 11:59 convinced the Commissioner to approve the deal.

Though Castellanos played shortstop in high school, the Tigers shifted him to third base as a professional. Castellanos appeared in seven games for the Gulf Coast Tigers of the Rookie-level Gulf Coast League that season. Before the 2011 season, Baseball America rated Castellanos as the 65th best prospect in baseball. He played for the West Michigan Whitecaps of the Class-A Midwest League. With the Whitecaps, Castellanos batted .312 with seven home runs and 76 RBIs, leading the Midwest League with 158 hits and being named the Tigers' minor league position player of the year.

 
Prior to the 2012 season, Baseball America ranked him as the second best prospect in the organization and 45th best in baseball. The Tigers invited Castellanos to spring training in 2012, and expected to assign him to either the Class-A Advanced Lakeland Tigers of the Florida State League or the Class-AA Erie SeaWolves of the Eastern League.  Castellanos began the 2012 season with Class-A Lakeland. He was named the Tigers' minor league player of the month of May 2012. After he batted .402 with 32 RBIs in 55 games for Lakeland, the Tigers promoted Castellanos to Erie on June 4.  Appearing in the 2012 All-Star Futures Game, Castellanos hit a three-run home run, and was named the game's Most Valuable Player. He batted .264 with Erie that year.

Castellanos was blocked at third base by Miguel Cabrera and at first base by Prince Fielder. He has been seen as a potential centerpiece for a trade to acquire a marquee talent. However, the Tigers considered Castellanos untouchable in trade negotiations. Castellanos began to take outfield practice in left field during the 2012 season.

With Castellanos now playing left field on a full-time basis, the Tigers optioned him to the Toledo Mud Hens of the Class AAA International League at the start of the 2013 season. In 134 games for the Mud Hens, Castellanos batted .276 with 18 home runs and 76 RBIs. He appeared in the Triple-A All-Star Game and was named to the International League's post-season All-Star team.

Detroit Tigers

2013–2016

When major league rosters expanded on September 1, 2013, Castellanos was among the players promoted to the Tigers, and made his major league debut that day, playing left field. On September 7, Castellanos made his first major league start, and recorded his first major league hit, an infield single, off Danny Duffy. However, he received infrequent playing time, as the Tigers were in a pennant race and manager Jim Leyland preferred to use players with more major league experience. He batted 5-for-18 with the Tigers in 2013.

After the 2013 season, the Tigers traded Prince Fielder. Dave Dombrowski, the general manager of the Tigers at that time, said that they would shift Miguel Cabrera to first base, and use Castellanos as their starting third baseman for 2014.

Castellanos hit his first MLB home run on April 9, 2014 off the top of the wall in dead center field off Josh Beckett of the Los Angeles Dodgers at Dodger Stadium. He finished his rookie season with a .259 batting average, 11 home runs, 31 doubles and 66 RBIs. He was named the 2014 Detroit Tigers/Detroit Sports Media Association Rookie of the Year.

On July 22, 2015, Castellanos hit his first career grand slam off Mike Montgomery of the Seattle Mariners. Castellanos hit .255 that season, while slamming 15 home runs and driving in 73.

Through the All-Star break of the 2016 season, Castellanos was hitting .302 with 17 home runs and 51 RBIs, while playing as the Tigers' starting third baseman. On August 6, Castellanos was struck by a pitch from New York Mets reliever Logan Verrett, fracturing the fifth metacarpal bone in his left hand. After the game, Castellanos was placed on the 15-day disabled list for the first time in his career, and was expected to miss at least four weeks. Castellanos did not return to the Tigers until the final week of the regular season, entering a September 27 game against the Cleveland Indians as a pinch hitter. During the 2016 season, Castellanos set career highs with a .285 average, 18 home runs, .331 on-base percentage, and a .496 slugging percentage, despite being limited to 110 games.

2017–2019
On January 13, 2017, the Tigers avoided arbitration with Castellanos, agreeing on a one-year contract worth $3 million. On July 18, Castellanos hit a single, triple and two home runs in a game against the Kansas City Royals, becoming the fourth Tigers player to do so since 1913, and the first Tigers player to do so since Dmitri Young in 2003.

On September 29, Castellanos recorded his 100th RBI of the season. Castellanos became the 10th player in Tigers history to drive in more than 100 runs at the age of 25 or younger, and the first player to do so since Miguel Cabrera in 2008. He became the sixth player in Tigers history to record 10 or more triples, 25 or more home runs and 100 or more RBIs in a season, and the first player to do so since Al Kaline in 1956. Castellanos finished 2017 with a .272 batting average, while setting career highs in doubles (36), triples (10), home runs (26) and RBIs (101). His 10 triples led the American League. He struggled defensively, however, as he led all third basemen with 18 errors and had a league-worst .939 fielding percentage among qualified third basemen. With the acquisition of third baseman Jeimer Candelario and the departure of right fielder J. D. Martinez, both in July trades, Castellanos began playing games in right field from early September to the end of the 2017 season.

On January 17, 2018, the Tigers avoided arbitration with Castellanos, agreeing on a one-year contract worth $6.05 million. On August 13, Castellanos went 5-for-5 with five RBIs, for his first career five-hit game. He became the first Tigers player with five hits in a game since Ian Kinsler in 2015. With two singles, two doubles and a home run, he also became the first Tiger with 10 total bases in a game since Justin Upton in 2017. Castellanos earned American League Player of the Week honors for the week of August 13–19. In seven games, he batted .393 with an OBP of .485 and had two homers, three doubles, eight runs scored, and ten RBI. The award was the first weekly honor for any Tiger player in 2018, and the first since J.D. Martinez won the award for the week ending July 17, 2017.

Castellanos hit a career-high .298 in the 2018 season, adding 23 home runs and 89 RBIs. He finished among the AL leaders in hits (185, third), doubles (46, fourth), and multi-hit games (56, third). He also led all MLB hitters (60 or more plate appearances) in batting average against left-handers, at .381. He was named the 2018 Tiger of the Year by the Detroit Chapter of the Baseball Writers' Association of America (BBWAA).

On January 11, 2019, the Tigers avoided arbitration with Castellanos, agreeing on a one-year contract worth $9.95 million.

Chicago Cubs
On July 31, 2019, the Tigers traded Castellanos along with cash considerations to the Chicago Cubs in exchange for Alex Lange and Paul Richan. In August, Castellanos hit .348 with 11 home runs, 20 RBIs, and nine doubles to go along with a .385 on-base percentage and a .713 slugging percentage. In 51 games for the Cubs in 2019, Castellanos hit .321 with 16 home runs, 36 RBIs, and a 1.002 OPS. For the 2019 season, Castellanos had a .289 batting average, 27 home runs, 73 RBIs and an MLB-leading 58 doubles. Castellanos' 58 doubles were the tenth-highest single-season total in MLB history and the most by any player since Todd Helton's 59 doubles in 2000, earning him the nickname "Nicky Two Bags." He also joined Hall of Famers Hank Greenberg (1934) and Joe Medwick (1937) as the only right-handed batters to ever hit 55 doubles and 25 home runs in the same season.

On defense in 2019, he posted −9 defensive runs saved, worst in the major leagues among right fielders, and −4.4 ultimate zone rating, second worst. Despite this, he also had a .993 fielding percentage, which was second best among right fielders.

Cincinnati Reds

Castellanos signed a four-year, $64 million contract with the Cincinnati Reds on January 27, 2020. The contract included an opt-out clause. In a 2020 season shortened by the COVID-19 pandemic, he hit just .225, with 14 home runs and 34 RBI in 60 games. On defense, Castellanos had a fielding percentage of .963, the lowest among all major league right fielders, with −4 defensive runs saved and a −3.0 ultimate zone rating.

On August 19, 2020, during the opening game of a doubleheader in Kauffman Stadium, Reds broadcaster Thom Brennaman was apologizing for a homophobic slur he uttered on a hot mic earlier in the broadcast. Mid-apology, Castellanos hit a home run, and Brennaman broke from his apology to deliver the play-by-play. Brennaman said, "I pride myself and think of myself as a man of faith, as there's a drive into deep left field by Castellanos, it will be a home run. And so that'll make it a 4-0 ballgame." The moment became an internet meme as a copypasta. ESPN's Pablo S. Torre later said it "was like listening to the band play on as the Titanic was sinking. Except the band was also somehow the iceberg."

On July 5, 2021, Castellanos hit a home run at Kauffman Stadium while the Kansas City Royals' broadcast was in the middle of a eulogy for a 96-year-old World War II veteran. Two months later, Castellanos hit a home run to left field in the third inning of a 6–4 loss to the St. Louis Cardinals on the twentieth anniversary of the September 11 attacks. This home run extended the Reds' lead to 4–0.

For the 2021 season, Castellanos posted career highs in batting average (.309) and home runs (34), while driving in 100 runs. It was his second career 100-RBI season and first since 2017. Defensively, he posted an improved fielding percentage of .991, having committed only three errors, but also had −4 defensive runs saved and a −4.5 ultimate zone rating.

Castellanos opted out of his contract after the 2021 season, becoming a free agent.

Philadelphia Phillies

On March 22, 2022, the Philadelphia Phillies signed Castellanos to a five-year, $100 million contract. 

Castellanos brought his tradition of creating awkward broadcast moments with him to Philadelphia, first in a spring training game against the Toronto Blue Jays on March 27, when he recorded his first hit as a Phillie while the Blue Jays broadcast team was discussing the DUI arrest of Toronto pitching coach Pete Walker two days earlier. Another instance came when Castellanos hit a home run just as broadcaster Tom McCarthy had finished telling viewers about the American Gold Star Mothers Chair of Honor in Citizens Bank Park on Memorial Day 2022. 

After a slump of no home runs lasting over a month, Castellanos hit a two-run home run to center field to give the Phillies a 3–1 lead over the Atlanta Braves on August 3. He then followed that with another home run on August 5.

In 2022, Castellanos batted .263/.305/.389 in 524 at bats. He swung at 57.0% of all pitches, the highest percentage of all major league batters.

Castellanos was the last out of the 2022 World Series, flying out to Houston Astros right fielder Kyle Tucker to end game 6 and clinch the series for the Astros.

Personal life
Castellanos has a son who was born in August 2013. He married his high school sweetheart, Vanessa Hernandez, the mother of his son, in 2015. They divorced in 2017. Castellanos started dating Jessica Gomez in 2017 and they married on February 8, 2021. Their son was born in May 2022.

Castellanos' younger brother, Ryan, played college baseball for Nova Southeastern University. The Tigers selected Ryan in the 25th round of the 2015 MLB draft, with Nick himself announcing the pick. In 2017, their father was diagnosed with brain cancer.

Notes

References

External links

1992 births
Living people
American sportspeople of Cuban descent
Baseball players from Florida
 Chicago Cubs players
Cincinnati Reds players
Detroit Tigers players
Erie SeaWolves players
Gulf Coast Tigers players
Internet memes
Internet memes introduced in 2020
Lakeland Flying Tigers players
Major League Baseball left fielders
Major League Baseball right fielders
Major League Baseball third basemen
Mesa Solar Sox players
People from Davie, Florida
Philadelphia Phillies players
Silver Slugger Award winners
Sportspeople from Broward County, Florida
Toledo Mud Hens players
West Michigan Whitecaps players